This is a bibliography of the works of Morteza Motahhari.

Morteza Motahhari (born 31 January 1919 in Fariman, Persia, assassinated 1 May 1979 (aged 60) in Tehran, Iran) was a Shiite cleric, professor of Islamic philosophy and theology, and commentator of Quran. He was a member of Islamic Coalition Party and one of the theorists of the Government of the Islamic Republic of Iran. Before the 1979 Iranian Revolution, he was a professor at the Faculty of Theology, University of Tehran. After the Revolution, he was appointed as the chairman of the Council of the Islamic Revolution. In the literature of the Islamic Republic of Iran, he is referred to as the "Martyr Teacher". He was one of the prominent thinkers and writers and had many works.

Most of the books attributed to him were his lectures and articles, which were collected and published as books after his assassination. In addition, the original language of these books is Persian.

Biography of the elders

Ethics, education and mysticism

Social and political

Principles of beliefs

Philosophy

Jurisprudence and law

History

Economy

Exegesis of the Quran

Notes

Collections

Excerpts

Related

See also
 Ali Khamenei bibliography
 Bibliography of Rasul Jafarian
 List of Shia books

References

External links
 Online int'l conference on Ayatollah Motahhari presents 70 articles - IBNA
 Martyrdom Anniversary of 'Ayatollah Morteza Motahhari'
 Biography Of Martyr Morteza Motahhari - Rasekhoon
 Articles about Morteza Motahhari
 Translated works of Ayatollah Motahhari to be revised - IBNA
 Ayatollah Morteza Motahari's biography
 Archives: Ayatollah Morteza Motahari
 Some pictures and posters about Ayatollah Morteza Motahhari - Majles Library

Bibliographies of Persian writers
Bibliographies by writer
Books by Morteza Motahhari
Bibliography